Stelvio Mestrovich (born 20 June 1948) is a writer, born in Zadar, then part of Yugoslavia, today in Croatia. His parents were Italian.

He has contributed to the Viennese magazine LOG, under the auspices of UNESCO, and has an entry in the Dizionoir, published by Delos Books.

His first novel, Suor Franziska, won the 2009 Viareggio-Farabolina Prize.

Published works

 "Il mio ultimo chiarodiluna" (Poem, Italy, 1974)
 "Il Ponte-die Bruecke" (Poem, Germany, 1979)
 "Suor Franziska" (Novel, Italy, 1992)
 "Il diario di Lucida Mansi" (Novel, Italy, 1995)
 "Anton Diabelli, un genio tranquillo" (Essay, Italy, 2001)
 "Appunti di archeologia musicale" (Essay, Italy, 2002)
 "Venezia rosso sangue" (Crime Novel, Italy, 2004 )
 "W.A.Mozart, il Cagliostro della musica" (Essay, Italy, 2006 )
 "Delitto in casa Goldoni" (Crime Novel, Italy, 2007 )
 "La sindrome di Jaele" (Crime Novel, Italy, 2009 )
 "Il mostro di Ebersdorf" (Crime Novel, Italia, 2010 )

References

1948 births
Living people
Italian musicologists
Writers from Zadar
Italian music critics